The 1999 NCAA Division I tournament championship game was played at University of Maryland's Byrd Stadium with an attendance of 24,135.

Tournament overview
In the tournament finals, the Virginia Cavaliers built a 9-3 lead by the third quarter, and held off the Syracuse Orange, the number eight seed, 12-10. This was Virginia's first NCAA title since 1972 and fourth overall including two pre-NCAA tournament Wingate Trophies in 1952 and 1970.

Syracuse was the first number eight seed to make it to the title game.

Virginia's Conor Gill was named the most outstanding player of the tournament, the first freshman ever to win that honor. Other notable players included Virginia's Jay Jalbert, Syracuse's Ryan Powell, and Delaware's player of the year, John Grant, Jr.

Grant, Jr. led the Delaware Blue Hens to a number six national ranking and their first ever tournament win. Grant Jr. was the tournament's leading scorer along with Ryan Powell, with 14 points in just two games.

Up until this final, Virginia had lost its last three championship game appearances in overtime. 
Syracuse made it close, scoring five unanswered goals to climb back to within 10-9 with 6:30 left.

The All-Tournament Team included Conor Gill, Derek Kenney, Ryan Curtis, Jay Jalbert, Court Weisleder, Tucker Radebaugh, Marshall Abrams, Ryan Powell, Dan Denihan and Georgetown’s Scott Urick.

Tournament results 

(i) one overtime

Tournament boxscores

Tournament Finals (May 31, Byrd Stadium)

Tournament Semi-finals (May 29, Byrd Stadium)

Tournament Quarterfinals

Tournament First Round

All-Tournament Team

Conor Gill, Virginia (Named the tournament's Most Outstanding Player)
Derek Kenney, Virginia
Ryan Curtis, Virginia
Jay Jalbert, Virginia
Court Weisleder, Virginia
Tucker Radebaugh, Virginia
Marshall Abrams, Syracuse
Ryan Powell, Syracuse
Dan Denihan, Johns Hopkins
Scott Urick, Georgetown

Leading Scorers

References

External links 

 NCAA on Demand video of Title Game
 Virginia Wins NCAA Men's Lacrosse Title May 31, 1999
 UVA Men's Lacrosse Downs Delaware 17-10 in NCAA Quarterfinals May 23, 1999

NCAA Division I Men's Lacrosse Championship
NCAA Division I Men's Lacrosse Championship
NCAA Division I Men's lacrosse
NCAA Division I Men's lacrosse